2014 World Masters Athletics Indoor Championships is the sixth in a series of World Masters Athletics Indoor Championships (also called World Masters Athletics Championships Indoor, or WMACi). This sixth edition took place in Budapest, Hungary, from 25 to 30 March 2014.

The main venue was SYMA Sport- és Rendezvényközpont , which has a banked indoor track where the turns are raised to neutralize the centrifugal force of athletes running the curves. Supplemental venues included Ferenc Puskás Stadium (demolished in 2017), KSI for throwing events, and City Park for non-stadia road events.

This Championships was organized by World Masters Athletics (WMA) in coordination with a Local Organising Committee (LOC): Márton Gyulai, Chairman, Hungarian Athletics Association.

The WMA is the global governing body of the sport of athletics for athletes 35 years of age or older, setting rules for masters athletics competition.

A full range of indoor track and field events were held.

In addition to indoor competition, non-stadia events included Half Marathon,

10K Race Walk, Weight Throw, Hammer Throw, Discus Throw and Javelin Throw.

Results
Past Championships results are archived at WMA.

Additional archives are available from European Masters Athletics

as a searchable pdf,

and from British Masters Athletic Federation.

in HTML format.

USATF Masters keeps a list of American record holders.

Canadian Masters Athletics keeps an archive of Canadian athletes and results at WMA Championships.

Official results are no longer available from the archived event website,

but can be retrieved from European Masters Athletics.

Several masters world records were set at this Indoor Championships. World records for 2014 are from WMA unless otherwise noted.

Women

Men

References

External links

Korean Masters participating at 2014 Budapest WMACi for the first time ever!

World Masters Athletics Championships
World Masters Athletics Championships
International athletics competitions hosted by Hungary
2014
Masters athletics (track and field) records